Ghulam Mohammed Abdul Khader  was the seventh Prince of Arcot. He was the son of Ghulam Mohiuddin Khan, the sixth Prince of Arcot.

Biography
He held the title from 1969, until his death 1993. He was succeeded by Muhammed Abdul Ali who succeeded as the titular head of the family.

References

External links

1993 deaths
20th-century Indian Muslims
Year of birth missing